Leonard Garfield Spencer (February 12, 1867 – December 15, 1914) was an early American recording artist. He began recording for the Columbia Phonograph Company, in 1889 or 1890. Between 1892 and 1897 he recorded extensively for the New Jersey Phonograph Company and its successor the United States Phonograph Company. He specialized in vaudeville sketches and comic songs, but also sang sentimental ballads popular at the time. He returned to Columbia in 1898 for an exclusive contract then began recording for Berliner Gramophone (disc) records in 1899 and continued with Victor and Columbia as discs became the dominant format in the early 1900s.

He began performing with banjoist Vess L. Ossman in 1901 and with Ada Jones in 1905. He is best remembered today for his vaudeville-style comic sketches, such as "The Arkansaw Traveler" (1902), combining clever turns of phrase, ironic elocutionary delivery, sound effects and music to create colorful dialogues featuring itinerant Southerners, auctioneers, circus barkers, and Irish, Jewish or Black Americans. Many of his roles were performed in either blackface or brownface. Spencer's output was eclectic. He imitated animal sounds in "A Barnyard Serenade" (1906) and released another record titled "The Transformation Scene from 'Dr. Jekyll and Mr. Hyde'," but also popularized songs still known today such as "Ta-Ra-Ra-Boom De-ay" and "A Hot Time in the Old Town." Music historian Bob Stanley deems it "probable" that Spencer's comedic "Arkansaw Traveler" routine was the first record to sell one million copies, though official documentation is lacking. 

As the popularity of Len's style of humor waned in the latter part of the decade, he opened a booking agency called "Len Spencer's Lyceum" in New York. He died of a cerebral hemorrhage while working at the Lyceum on December 15, 1914.

Songs
Some of his most popular recordings include:
 "Ta-Ra-Ra-Boom De-ay" (1892)
 "The Old Folks at Home" (1892)
 "Little Alabama Coon" (1895)
 "Dat New Bully" (1895)
 "A Hot Time in the Old Town" (1897)
 "Hello! Ma Baby" (1899)
 "Ma Tiger Lily" (1900)
 "Arkansaw Traveler" (1902)
 "Peaches and Cream", (1906) with Ada Jones (John B. Lowitz wax cylinder)

See also
Ada Jones

References

External links

 
 
 Len Spencer cylinder recordings, from the Cylinder Audio Archive at the University of California, Santa Barbara Library.
 Len Spencer recordings at the Discography of American Historical Recordings.
 A 1947 biography of Spencer in Jim Walsh's "Favorite Pioneer Recording Artists", and a 1958 update with corrections.

1867 births
1914 deaths
American male composers
American composers
Pioneer recording artists